Jean Paul Pierre Pineau (4 October 1922 – 2 June 2020) was a French politician.

Biography
The former director of Crédit Agricole, Pineau was a municipal councillor for Châtillon-sur-Thouet from 1953 to 2001, Deputy for Deux-Sèvres from 1978 to 1981, and General Councillor for the Canton of Parthenay from 1979 to 1994, as well as mayor of Châtillon-sur-Thouet between 1983 and 2001.

Pineau was a Knight of the Legion of Honour, Knight of the Ordre des Palmes académiques, and Knight of the Order of Agricultural Merit.

References

Union for French Democracy politicians
Deputies of the 6th National Assembly of the French Fifth Republic
1922 births
2020 deaths
Knights of the Order of Agricultural Merit
Chevaliers of the Ordre des Palmes Académiques
Chevaliers of the Légion d'honneur
21st-century French politicians